Methylocella tundrae is a species of bacterium. It is notable for oxidising methane. Its cells are aerobic, Gram-negative, non-motile, dinitrogen-fixing rods. Strain T4T (=DSM 15673T =NCIMB 13949T) is the type strain.

References

Further reading

External links

LPSN
Type strain of Methylocella tundrae at BacDive -  the Bacterial Diversity Metadatabase

Beijerinckiaceae
Bacteria described in 2004